Peru has submitted films for the Academy Award for Best International Feature Film since 1967, when it became the fourth Western Hemisphere country to enter the Oscar Foreign Film race, after Mexico, Brazil and Argentina. The award is handed out annually by the United States Academy of Motion Picture Arts and Sciences to a feature-length motion picture produced outside the United States that contains primarily non-English dialogue.

Prior to 2009, Peru had entered the competition 15 times, but had never yet been nominated for an Academy Award. For the 2009 ceremony, Golden Bear winner The Milk of Sorrow (La Teta Asustada) was chosen to represent Peru and the nation received its first Academy Award nomination for the film. Six of Peru's submissions were directed by Francisco J. Lombardi while three others were directed by Armando Robles Godoy.

Submissions
The Academy of Motion Picture Arts and Sciences has invited the film industries of various countries to submit their best film for the Academy Award for Best Foreign Language Film since 1956. The Foreign Language Film Award Committee oversees the process and reviews all the submitted films. Following this, they vote via secret ballot to determine the five nominees for the award. Below is a list of the films that have been submitted by Peru for review by the Academy for the award by year and the respective Academy Awards ceremony.

Submissions

Notes

References

External links
The Official Academy Awards Database
The Motion Picture Credits Database
IMDb Academy Awards Page

Peru
Academy Award for Best Foreign Language Film
Lists of films by country of production
Academy Award